The 4th NKVD Rifle Division was a military formation of the People's Commissariat of Internal Affairs of the USSR during World War II. The division was active in the Deportation of the Chechens, Ingush, and Crimean Tatars and helped eliminate Lithuanian resistance to Soviet occupation.

History 
The 4th Division was formed on 28 September 1943 by order of the NKVD. It was formed in the Krasnodar Territory from soldiers of the NKVD's Internal Troops Directorate in the North Caucasus Military District. The division's headquarters was established in the city of Krasnodar.

The division took part in regular army operations during several time periods, the first of which lasted from October to December 1943. During these periods, the division was responsible for protecting the rear of several fronts, namely the North Caucasian, 1st Baltic, 2nd and 3rd Belorussian Fronts. In this capacity, the division was responsible for protecting communications lines, maintaining law and order in recaptured territory, and combating enemy sabotage and reconnaissance.

After the first period of activation, the division was sent to Chechnya. In January and February 1944, it performed service and combat missions in the region, with the main force operating around the city of Grozny and the 137th Rifle Regiment in the village of Sunzha. Beginning on 23 February, the division began taking part in the deportation of native Chechens and Ingush from the Checheno-Ingush SSR to Kazakhstan. On 20 March, on the completion of the deportation, the division was recalled to its old headquarters in Krasnodar.

From 12 to 19 May, elements of the division (25th, 40th, and 290th Rifle Regiments) participated in the deportation of the Crimean Tatars.

On 12 August, the division relocated to the Lithuanian SSR and established a new headquarters in Vilnius. Its new mission was to liquidate elements of the Home Army and National Armed Forces which were operating in Lithuania and to combat the underground nationalist Lithuanian Liberation Army. From 24 December 1944 to 7 January 1945 the 25th Rifle Regiment joined with the 136th Rifle Regiment of the internal troops of the NKVD and destroyed a detachment of the Home Army in the Trakai District south of Vilnius.

Following the end of World War II, the division remained stationed in Lithuania and continued to operate against the Lithuanian Liberation Army. On 9 April 1947 the 32nd Rifle Regiment destroyed the headquarters of the Samogitian cell of the Liberation Army. On 10 August 1948 the 298th Rifle Regiment destroyed the headquarters of the Tauras cell of the Liberation Army. On 26 August 1948 the 32nd Rifle Regiment destroyed the headquarters of the Pergale cell of the Liberation Army. On 13 August 1949 the 25th Rifle Regiment destroyed the headquarters of the Prisikėlimas cell of the Liberation Army.

On 12 August 1951, the division was reorganized in the Baltic Military District into a department of the new Ministry of State Security of the USSR.

Organization

Order of battle 

 40th NKVD Rifle Regiment
 137th NKVD Rifle Regiment
 298th NKVD Infantry Regiment
 290th NKVD Novorossiysk Infantry Regiment
 25th NKVD Rifle Regiment
 261st NKVD Rifle Regiment
 32nd NKVD Infantry Regiment
 273rd NKVD Gdansk Rifle Regiment
 353rd NKVD Rifle Regiment
 Communications Company
 Driver Company
 Internal NKVD Motorized Rifle Company
 Sapper Company
 3881st Postal Field Station

Commanders 

 Major General Pavel Vetrov (10 October 1943–1946)
 Major GeneralIvan Pankin  (1948–1950)
 Colonel Ivan Babintsev (1951–12 August 1951)

References 

Divisions of the NKVD in World War II
Military units and formations disestablished in 1951